The 2010–11 FA Women's Premier League Cup was the 21st edition of the cup tournament for teams both levels of the Women's Premier League, the National Division and the Northern and Southern Divisions, the second and third level of English women's football respectively. 

This was the first season of the cup following the demotion of the FA Women's Premier League National Division from the highest level of women's football in England; it became the second tier due to the creation of the FA Women's Super League in 2011. As a result, a number of previous competitors such as Arsenal LFC did not compete in the Premier League Cup. 

The cup was won by National Division side Barnet F.C. Ladies, who defeated Nottingham Forest L.F.C. 5-4 on penalties after the match finished 0-0 after extra time.

Group stage

Twenty-eight teams from both tiers of the Premier League were drawn into seven groups of four with the first and second placed teams in each group going through to the knock-out stage. In addition, the best two third placed teams based on points obtained also went through to the knock out stage.

Group one

Group two

Group three

Group four

Group Five

Group Six

Group Seven

First round

Quarter finals

Semi-finals

Final

See also
 2010–11 FA Women's Premier League

FA Women's National League Cup
Prem